Multiple Precision Integers and Rationals (MPIR) is an open-source software multiprecision integer  library forked from the GNU Multiple Precision Arithmetic Library (GMP) project. It consists of much code from past GMP releases, and some original contributed code.

According to the MPIR-devel mailing list, "MPIR is no longer maintained", except for building the old code on Windows using new versions of Microsoft Visual Studio.

According to the MPIR developers, some of the main goals of the MPIR project were:
 Maintaining compatibility with GMP - so that MPIR can be used as a replacement for GMP.
 Providing build support for Linux, Mac OS, Solaris and Windows systems.
 Supporting building MPIR using Microsoft based build tools for use in 32- and 64-bit versions of Windows.

MPIR is optimised for many processors (CPUs). Assembly language code exists for these : ARM, DEC Alpha 21064, 21164, and 21264, AMD K6, K6-2, Athlon, K8 and K10, Intel Pentium, Pentium Pro-II-III, Pentium 4, generic x86, Intel IA-64, Core 2, i7, Atom, Motorola-IBM PowerPC 32 and 64, MIPS R3000, R4000, SPARCv7, SuperSPARC, generic SPARCv8, UltraSPARC.

Language bindings

See also 

 Arbitrary-precision arithmetic, data type: bignum
 GNU Multiple Precision Arithmetic Library
 GNU Multiple Precision Floating-Point Reliably (MPFR)
 Class Library for Numbers supporting GiNaC

References

External links 

 GMP — official site of GNU Multiple Precision Arithmetic Library
 MPFR — official site of GNU Multiple Precision Floating-Point Reliably

C (programming language) libraries
Computer arithmetic
Computer arithmetic algorithms
Free software programmed in C
Numerical software